Luca Pizzul (born 31 March 1999) is an Italian professional footballer who plays as a left back for Serie D club Mestre.

Club career
Formed on Udinese youth system, in 2016 Pizzul joined Serie D club Triestina.

On 6 July 2019, he was loaned to Renate.

On 15 September 2020, he joined Serie C club Pro Patria.

References

External links
 
 

1999 births
Living people
Footballers from Trieste
Italian footballers
Association football defenders
Serie C players
Serie D players
U.S. Triestina Calcio 1918 players
A.C. Renate players
Aurora Pro Patria 1919 players
A.C. Mestre players